Mount Krokisius is a mountain 0.6 nautical miles (1.1 km) northeast of Moltke Harbor, South Georgia. Named by the German group of the International Polar Year Investigations, 1882–83, for Corvette Captain Krokisius, commander of the Marie, one of the two ships of the expedition.

Krokisius, Mount